Algoma Compass, formerly Roger M. Kyes and Adam E. Cornelius, is a self-unloading bulk carrier built in Toledo, Ohio in 1973 for the American Steamship Company. The bulk carrier carried bulk cargoes throughout the Great Lakes and St. Lawrence Seaway. The vessel has earned a reputation as a "hard luck" ship, experiencing mechanical failures and groundings. In 2018, the ship was acquired by Algoma Central and put in service as Algoma Compass.

Design and description

The deadweight tonnage increased to 29,127.

Algoma Compass is powered by two  General Motors Electro Motive Division (EMD) type 20-645-E78 two-stroke cycle, single acting V-20 cylinder diesel engines through single reduction gears to a single controllable pitch propeller turning one propeller. The vessel is also equipped with  stern and bow thrusters.

The bulk carrier has four holds and 20 hatches serviced by a single belt gravity system feeding a stern-mounted incline belt elevator. They supply a  boom capable of luffing 18 degrees and operating 90 degrees to either port or stern.

Construction and career 
The ship was ordered from the American Shipbuilding Company of Toledo, Ohio with the yard number 200. The ship was launched on March 28, 1973, named Roger M. Kyes. The vessel was named after Roger M. Kyes, a former executive with General Motors and former United States Deputy Secretary of Defense, who served from 1969–1970 as the chairman and chief executive officer of the American Steamship Company. The ship was sponsored by his wife and marked the first ship to be constructed in Toledo since 1959. Roger M. Kyes was completed on August 1, 1973, registered in Wilmington, Delaware for the American Steamship Company and placed in service, transporting bulk cargoes of items such as iron ore pellets throughout the Great Lakes and St. Lawerence Seaway.

In 1975/76, the bow was ice-strengthened. On September 22, 1976 while in Buffalo, New York's harbour Roger M. Kyes struck bottom tearing holes in two double bottom tanks and damaging three others. The vessel sailed to Chicago, Illinois arriving on September 27 for repairs. On September 7, 1978, the bulk carrier required the aid of tugboats to get the ship to dock after losing power on Lake St. Clair.

While sailing up the Rouge River, Roger M. Kyess radio mast struck the I-75 freeway bridge over the river on July 24, 1983. On August 23, the ship ran aground in the Detroit River's Trenton Channel. The vessel's cargo was lightered and Roger M. Kyes was freed with the aid of ten tugboats, being taken for repair at Sturgeon Bay, Wisconsin. The ship returned to service the following year.

On October 27, 1987, Roger M. Kyes ran aground again, this time on Gull Island Shoal in Lake Erie. The ship's cargo was lightered again and Roger M. Kyes was able to free herself on October 30. Sent for repair again, in June 1989, she was renamed Adam E. Cornelius, after Adam Edward Cornelius, one of the co-founders of the American Steamship Company, after an older ship named after him was sold. She was the fourth vessel to be named after Cornelius.

From 1994 to 1998, Adam E. Cornelius was chartered to Inland Steel. The vessel ran aground again on July 14, 1994 near the Soo Locks in the St. Marys River. Her cargo was lightered again and after being freed, completed the unloading of her cargo before sailing for Sturgeon Bay for further repairs. In March 1996 and January 1997 Adam E. Cornelius suffered ice damage while operating on the Great Lakes, the latter incident forcing the ship to be escorted to Sturgeon Bay for repairs by the United States Coast Guard and tugboats for fear of the ship sinking. The ship returned to service in 1999.

She was laid up in Toledo, Ohio in 2012–2014 and in Huron, Ohio in 2015. In late 2017 she was sold to the Algoma Central Corp., registered in St. Catharines, Ontario and renamed Algoma Compass in 2018.  She returned to service in May 2018 after being laid up for nearly two-and-a-half years. In Algoma service, the ship primarily services the road salt and construction material markets.

See also

Notes

Citations

References
 
 
 
 
 
 
 
 

Great Lakes freighters
1973 ships
Algoma Central Marine
Ships built in Toledo, Ohio